Franz Naval, real name Franz Pogačnik (20 October 1865 in Ljubljana, Slovenia – 9 August 1939 in Vienna) was an Austrian operatic lyric tenor.

References

Sources 
 
 Franz Naval on OeML
 K. J. Kutsch, Leo Riemens: Großes Sängerlexikon. original edition. K. G. Saur, Bern, 1993, second volume M–Z, 
 Michael Wolf, Klaus Edel: Ausgesuchte Prominentengräber auf dem Evangelischen Friedhof Simmering. Eine Einführung in die Geschichte des Friedhofes und ein Begleiter zu ausgesuchten Prominentengräbern. Published by Evangelischen Presseverband in Österreich, Vienna 2000.
 Felix Czeike: Historischer Lexikon Wien, Vienna 1995,

External links 

 
 Franz Naval on Geschichtewiki.wien 
 Franz Naval on WiSo Name
 Franz Naval Tonaufnahme aus dem Archiv der Österreichische Mediathek: (Romanze extract from Mignon)

1865 births
1939 deaths
Musicians from Ljubljana
Austrian operatic tenors